Denise Georgette Gordy (born November 11, 1949) is an American former film and television actress and singer. She is a niece of Motown founder Berry Gordy.

Family and career
Denise Georgette Gordy was born in Detroit, Michigan. She is a daughter of George and Rosemary Gordy and sister of Patrice and George Gordy, Jr., among others. Motown founder Berry Gordy is her uncle; her aunt is Anna Gordy Gaye.
Gordy has appeared in numerous television and theatrical features, beginning in 1972 with Lady Sings the Blues as a dancer in the nightclub chorus. In 1974, Gordy appeared in Black Fist and ending most recently with Toy Soldiers in 1991. Gordy also has contributed vocals to the soundtrack album for the film Black Fist, which was originally titled Bogard, as well as recording the song "Let's Do It Again" for that same movie.

Personal life
Gordy was married to actor Richard Lawson from December 31, 1978 until 1989. They share one child, actress Bianca Lawson. Gordy is also the biological mother of Marvin Gaye III, who was born on November 17, 1965 when she was  sixteen years old. His biological father, singer Marvin Gaye, was 26 years old and married to Gordy's aunt Anna at the time. She agreed to give birth to the child because her aunt was unable to conceive. Shortly after Marvin III's birth, Anna adopted him.

Filmography

References

External links

1949 births
American television actresses
20th-century American actresses
Living people
Denise
Denise
Singers from Detroit
People from Detroit
African-American actresses
Actresses from Detroit
American film actresses
African-American women singers